Poland was ruled at various times either by dukes and princes (10th to 14th centuries) or by kings (11th to 18th centuries). During the latter period, a tradition of free election of monarchs made it a uniquely electable position in Europe (16th to 18th centuries).

The first known Polish ruler is Duke Mieszko I, who adopted Christianity under the authority of Rome in the year 966. He was succeeded by his son, Bolesław I the Brave, who greatly expanded the boundaries of the Polish state and ruled as the first king in 1025. The following centuries gave rise to the mighty Piast dynasty, consisting of both kings such as Mieszko II Lambert, Przemysł II or Władysław I the Elbow-high and dukes like Bolesław III Wrymouth. The dynasty ceased to exist with the death of Casimir III the Great in 1370. In the same year, the Capetian House of Anjou became the ruling house with Louis I as king of both Poland and Hungary. His daughter, Jadwiga, later married Jogaila, the pagan Grand Duke of Lithuania, who in 1386 was baptized and crowned as Władysław II Jagiełło, thus creating the Jagiellonian dynasty and a personal union between Poland and Lithuania.

During the reign of Casimir IV Jagiellon and Sigismund I the Old, culture flourished and cities developed. This era of progress, also known as the Polish Renaissance, continued until the Union of Lublin under Sigismund II Augustus, which unofficially marked the end of the Polish Golden Age. After the death of the last Jagiellonian king, the united Polish–Lithuanian Commonwealth became an elective monarchy with mostly foreigners elected as monarchs such as Henry III of France, who witnessed the introduction of the Golden Liberty system and Stephen Báthory, a capable military commander who strengthened the nation. The meaningful rule of the Vasa dynasty initially expanded the Commonwealth as the arts and crafts developed, as well as trade and commerce. King Sigismund III Vasa, a talented but somewhat despotic ruler, involved the country in many wars, which subsequently resulted in the successful capture of Moscow and the loss of Livonia to Sweden. His son, Władysław IV Vasa, fiercely defended the Commonwealth's borders and continued the policy of his father until his death, unlike John II Casimir whose tragic rule resulted in his abdication.

The election of John III Sobieski to the Polish throne proved to be beneficial for the Commonwealth. A brilliant military tactician, John III led the coalition forces to victory at Vienna in 1683 and he partially recaptured land from the Ottoman Empire. However, the years that followed were not as successful. The long and ineffective rule of the Wettin dynasty (Augustus II the Strong and Augustus III) placed the Commonwealth under the influence of Saxony and the Russian Empire. Additional feuds with rebel nobility (szlachta) and most notably Stanislaus I Leszczyński and France diminished the influence of Poland-Lithuania in the region, which led to the partitions that occurred under King Stanislaus II Augustus, yet another enlightened, but ineffective monarch. The last true sovereign of Poland was Frederick Augustus I as Duke of Warsaw, who throughout his political career attempted to rehabilitate the Polish state. Following the Napoleonic Wars, many sovereigns claimed the title of Polish king, duke or ruler, notably German, Russian and Austrian emperors. The monarchy was abolished and a parliamentary republican authority was established when Poland was re-constituted as a sovereign state in 1918.

Legendary

Most of the legendary Polish rulers appear for the first time in chronicles from the 13th century and their existence has not been determined.

|-
|
| 
| Unknown
| Unknown
| Unknown
|Legendary founder of the Polish nation according to folktales, tribal leader
| Lechites (Tribe)

|-
|also Krak or Grakch
| 
| 
| Unknown
| 
|  Legendary founder of Kraków
| Lechites (Tribe)

|-
|
| 
|Son of Krakus I
| Unknown
| 
| Succession
| Lechites (Tribe)

|-
|
| 
| Son of Krakus I, brother of Krakus II
| Unknown
| 
| Succession
| Lechites (Tribe)

|-
|also Wąda
| 
| Daughter of Krakus, sister of Krakus II and Lech II
| Unknown
| 
| Succession
| Lechites (Tribe)

|-
| Dukealso Leszek
| 
| 
| Unknown
| 
| Birth name Przemysław, defeated the Hungarians and was crownedElected
| Goplans and Polans (Tribes)

|-
| Duke
| 
| Presumed son of Leszko I, Alleged progenitor of the Popielids dynasty
| Unknown
| 
| Succession
| Popielids

|-
| Duke
| 
| Presumed son of Leszko II
| Unknown
| 
| Succession
| Popielids

|-
| Duke
| 
| Presumed son of Leszko III
| Unknown
| 
| Succession
| Popielids

|-
| Duke
| 
| Presumed son of Popiel I
|  NN, A German Princess
| 
| A legendary ruler dethroned by Piast. He appears (without the number) in the oldest Polish chronicle, Gesta principum Polonorum from the early 12th centurySuccession
| Popielids

|-
| 
| 
| Son of Chościsko
|  Rzepicha
| 
| Legendary founder of the Piast dynasty. He appears in the oldest Polish chronicle, Gesta principum Polonorum from the early 12th century
| Piast
|}

Semi-legendary 

The three direct predecessors of Mieszko I are known only from the account of Gallus Anonymus, who wrote the oldest Polish chronicle, Gesta principum Polonorum at the beginning of the 12th century. Though their historicity was once debatable, now historians tend to consider them actually existing rulers.

|-
| Dukealso Ziemowit9th century
| 
| 9th centuryPresumed son of Piast the Wheelwrightand Rzepicha
| Unknown
| 9th century
| Named the Duke of the Polans after his father, Piast the Wheelwright, refused to take the place of legendary Duke PopielElected
| Piast
| 

|-
| Dukealso Leszek or Lestko9th century10th century
| 
| 880Presumed son of Siemowit
| Unknown
| 950
| Named the Duke of the Polans after succeeding his fatherSuccession
| Piast
| 

|-
| Dukealso ZiemomysłLatin: Zemomislaus10th century/960
| 
| Presumed son of Lestek
| Unknown
| 960
| Named the Duke of the Polans after succeeding his fatherSuccession
| Piast
| 
|}

House of Piast

|-
| DukeMieszko ILatin: Misico, dux Wandalorum96025 May 992( years)
| 
| Son of semi-legendary Siemomysł
|  Doubravka of Bohemia2 children Oda of Haldensleben3 children
| 25 May 992PoznańAged about 62
| First Christian ruler of PolandSuccession
| Piast

|-
| KingBolesław I the Bravealso Boleslaus I the Great9921025 (as duke)18 April 102517 June 1025 (as king)( years)
| 
| PoznańSon of Mieszko I and Doubravka of Bohemia
|  Hunilda, daughter of Rikdag  Judith of Hungary  Emnilda of Lusatia Oda of Meissen
| 17 June 1025KrakówAged about 58
| First crowned kingSuccession
| Piast

|-
| KingMieszko II Lambert25 December 10251031( years)
| 
| Son of Bolesław I the Brave and Emnilda of Lusatia
|  Richeza of Lotharingia, 4 children
| 10/11 May 1034PoznańAged about 44
| Crowned kingSuccessionDeposed as a result of the Pagan Rebellion
| Piast

|-
| DukeBezprym10311032 ( years)
| 
| Son of Bolesław I the Brave and Judith of Hungary
| Unknown
| Aged about 46
| Country divided, ruler of a DuchyUsurped
| Piast

|-
| DukeOtto10321033 ( years)
| 
| Son of Bolesław I the Brave and Emnilda of Lusatia
| Unknown
| Aged about 33
| Country divided, ruler of a DuchyUsurped
| Piast

|-
| DukeDytrykalso Dietrich and Theoderick10321033 ( years)
| 
| Son of Lambert Mieszkowic or Mieszko Mieszkowic
| Unknown
| Aged about 41
| Country divided, ruler of a DuchyUsurped
| Piast

|-
| DukeMieszko II Lambert10331034( years)
| 
| Son of Bolesław I the Brave and Emnilda of Lusatia
|  Richeza of Lotharingia, 4 children
| 10/11 May 1034PoznańAged about 44
| Restored as duke
| Piast

|-
| DukeBolesław the Forgotten10341038/1039( years)
| 
| before 1016Presumed son of Mieszko II Lambert
| Unknown
| 1038/1039
| Semi-legendary, existence disputed
| Piast

|-
| DukeCasimir I the Restorer1034/10401058( years)
| 
| 25 July 1016Son of Mieszko II Lambert and Richeza of Lotharingia
|  Maria Dobroniega, 5 children
| 19 March 1058PoznańAged 41
| Made prince in 1034, returned from abroad in 1040Restoration
| Piast

|-
| KingBolesław II the Generous10581076 (as duke)26 December 10761079 (as king)( years)
| 
| 1042Son of Casimir I the Restorer and Maria Dobroniega
|  Wyszesława, 1 son
| 2/3 April 1081Hungary or OssiachAged about 39
| Crowned king in 1076Deposed and exiled in 1079 after slaying Saint Stanislaus
| Piast

|-
| DukeWładysław I Herman10794 June 1102( years)
| 
| 1044Son of Casimir I the Restorer and Maria Dobroniega
|  Przecława Judith of Bohemia Judith of Swabia
| 24 June 1102PłockAged about 58
| Succeeded brother after his exile
| Piast

|-
| DukeZbigniew11021107( years)
| 
| Son of Władysław I Herman and Przecława (?)
| Unknown
| 8 July 1113Aged about 40
| Succession
| Piast

|-
| DukeBolesław III Wrymouthalso Boleslaus III11071138( years)
| 
| 20 August 1086PłockSon of Władysław I Herman and Judith of Bohemia
|  Zbyslava of Kiev Salomea of Berg
| 28 October 1138SochaczewAged 52
| SuccessionHis death led to the fragmentation of Poland
| Piast 
|}

Fragmentation of Poland (1138–1320)

|-
| High DukeWładysław II the Exile11381146( years)
| 
| 1105KrakówSon of Bolesław III Wrymouth and Zbyslava of Kiev
|  Agnes of Babenberg, 5 children
| 30 May 1159AltenburgAged 54
| SuccessionDeposed and exiled
| Piast

|-
| High DukeBolesław IV the Curly11461173( years)
| 
| Son of Bolesław III Wrymouth and Salomea of Berg
|  Viacheslava of Novgorod, 3 children
| 5 January 1173Aged about 51
| Succeeded exiled half-brother
| Piast

|-
| High DukeMieszko III the Old11731177( years)
| 
| Son of Bolesław III Wrymouth and Salomea of Berg
|  Elisabeth of Hungary Eudoxia of Kiev
| 13 March 1202KaliszAged about 75
| SuccessionDeposed by brother in 1177
| Piast

|-
| High DukeCasimir II the Just11771190( years)
| 
| Son of Bolesław III Wrymouth and Salomea of Berg
|  Helen of Znojmo, 7 children
| 5 May 1194KrakówAged about 56
| Usurped power from brother
| Piast

|-
| Mieszko III the Old11901190
| 
| –
| –
| –
| Usurped
| Piast

|-
| Casimir II the Just11901194
| 
| –
| –
| –
| Usurped
| Piast

|-
| High DukeLeszek I the White11941198( years)
| 
| /1185Son of Casimir II the Just and Helen of Znojmo
|  Grzymisława of Luck, 2 children
| 24 November 1227Marcinkowo GórneAged about 43
| Succession
| Piast

|-
| Mieszko III the Old11981199
| 
| –
| –
| –
| Usurped
| Piast

|-
| Leszek I the White11991199
| 
| –
| –
| –
| Restored
| Piast

|-
| Mieszko III the Old11991202
| 
| –
| –
| –
| Usurped
| Piast

|-
| High DukeWładysław III Spindleshanks12021206( years)
| 
| Son of Mieszko III the Old and Eudoxia of Kiev
|  Lucia of Rügen, 2 children
| 3 November 1231Aged about 64
| Usurped
| Piast

|-
| Leszek I the White12061210
| 
| –
| –
| –
| Restored
| Piast

|-
| High DukeMieszko IV Tanglefoot12101211( years)
| 
| Son of Władysław II the Exile and Agnes of Babenberg
|  Ludmila, 5 children
| 16 May 1211Aged about 81
| Usurped
| Piast

|-
| Leszek I the White12111227( years)
| 
| –
| –
| –
| RestoredMurdered in 1227
| Piast

|-
| Władysław III Spindleshanks12271229
| 
| –
| –
| –
| Usurped
| Piast

|-
| High DukeKonrad I of Masovia12291232( years)
| 
| /1188Son of Casimir II the Just and Helen of Znojmo
|  Agafia of Rus, 10 children
| 31 August 1247Aged about 60
| Usurped
| Piast

|-
| High DukeHenry I the Bearded12321238( years)
| 
| /1188GłogówSon of Bolesław I the Tall and Christina (?)
|  Hedwig of Andechs, 7 children
| 19 March 1238Krosno OdrzańskieAged about 73
| Usurped
| Piast

|-
| High DukeHenry II the Pious12381241( years)
| 
| GłogówSon of Henry the Bearded and Hedwig of Andechs
|  Anne of Bohemia, 10 children
| 9 April 1241Legnickie PoleAged about 45
| SuccessionKilled at the Battle of Legnica
| Piast

|-
| High DukeBolesław II the Horned12411241
| 
| /1225GłogówSon of Henry II the Pious and Anne of Bohemia
|  Hedwig of Anhalt, 7 children Euphemia of Pomerania Sophia of Dyhrn
| 26 December 1278Legnica
| SuccessionDeposed
| Piast

|-
| High DukeKonrad I of Masovia12411243( years)
| 
| /1188Son of Casimir II the Just and Helen of Znojmo
|  Agafia of Rus, 10 children
| 31 August 1247Aged about 60
| Usurped
| Piast

|-
| High DukeBolesław V the Chaste12431279( years)
| 
| 21 June 1226Stary KorczynSon of Leszek I the White and Grzymisława of Luck
|  Kinga of Poland, no children
| 7 December 1279KrakówAged 52
| Restored as rightful Duke
| Piast

|-
| High DukeLeszek II the Black12791288( years)
| 
| Brześć KujawskiSon of Casimir I of Kuyavia and Constance of Wrocław
|  Gryfina of Halych
| 30 September 1288KrakówAged about 47
| Succession
| Piast

|-
| High DukeHenryk IV ProbusEnglish: Henry the Righteous12881290( years)
| 
| /1258Son of Henry III the White and Judith of Masovia
|  Constance of Opole Matilda of Brandenburg
| 23 June 1290WrocławAged about 32
| Succession
| Piast
|}

Attempt at restoration (1295–1296)

|-
| KingPrzemysł IIEnglish: Premislaus II12901291 (as duke)12951296 (as king)(1 year)
| 
| 
| 14 October 1257PoznańSon of Przemysł I of Greater Poland and Elisabeth of Wrocław
|  Ludgarda of Mecklenburg Richeza of Sweden Margaret of Brandenburg
| 8 February 1296RogoźnoAged 38
| Crowned king in 1295Granted Poland its coat of armsAssassinated
| Piast
|}

House of Přemyslid

|-
| KingWenceslaus II of Bohemia12961300 (as High Duke)13001305 (as King)( years)
| 
| 
| 27 September 1271PragueSon of Ottokar II of Bohemia and Kunigunda of Slavonia
|  Judith of Habsburg Elisabeth Richeza of Poland
| 21 June 1305PragueAged 33
| Crowned himself King of Poland in 1300
| Přemyslid

|-
| (Uncrowned)Wenceslaus III of Bohemia13051306(1 year)
| 
| 
| 6 October 1289PragueSon of Wenceslaus II and Judith of Habsburg
|  Viola of Teschen
| 4 August 1306OlomoucAged 16
| SuccessionUncrowned and assassinated
| Přemyslid
|}

House of Piast (restored)

|-
| KingLadislaus the Short13061320(as High Duke)20 January 13202 March 1333(as King)()
| 
| 
| Son of Casimir I of Kuyavia and Euphrosyne of Opole
|  Jadwiga of Kalisz, 6 children
| 2 March 1333KrakówAged about 73
| Reunited the Kingdom of Poland after fragmentationCrowned King in 1320
| Piast

|-
| KingCasimir III the Great25 April 13335 November 1370()
| 
| 
| 30 April 1310KowalSon of Władysław I the Elbow-high and Jadwiga of Kalisz
|  Aldona of Lithuania  Adelaide of Hesse Christina Rokiczana Hedwig of Sagan
| 5 November 1370KrakówAged 60
| SuccessionStrengthened Poland's position in EuropeDied without a male heirLast monarch from the Piast Dynasty
| Piast
|}

House of Anjou

|-
| KingLouis17 November 137010 September 1382()
| 
| 
| 5 March 1326VisegrádSon of Charles I of Hungary and Elizabeth of Poland
|  Margaret of Bohemia Elizabeth of Bosnia
| 10 September 1382Nagyszombat (Trnava)Aged 56
| Succeeded his uncle, Casimir III, to the Polish throne
| Anjou

|-
| KingHedwig16 October 138417 July 1399()
| 
| 
| 3 October 137418 February 1374BudaDaughter of Louis I of Hungary and Elizabeth of Bosnia
|  Władysław II Jagiełło (Jogaila)
| 17 July 1399KrakówAged 25
| Succeeded her father in PolandHer husband was crowned jure uxoris on 4 March 1386
| Anjou
|}

House of Jagiellon

|-
| KingWładysław II Jagiełło4 March 13861 June 1434()
| 
| 
| /1362VilniusSon of Algirdas and Uliana of Tver
|  Hedwig of Poland (Jadwiga) Anna of Cilli  Elisabeth of Pilica Sophia of Halshany
| 1 June 1434GródekAged 72–82
| Born a paganPreviously Grand Duke of LithuaniaCrowned co-ruler with wife HedwigLongest-reigning Polish monarch
| Jagiellon

|-
| KingWładysław IIIEnglish: Ladislaus III of Varna25 July 143410 November 1444()
| 
| 
| 31 October 1424KrakówSon of Jogaila and Sophia of Halshany
| Unmarried and childless
| 10 November 1444VarnaAged 20
| Succeeded his father in PolandKilled at the Battle of VarnaInterregnum until 1447
| Jagiellon

|-
| KingCasimir IV25 June 14477 June 1492()
| 
| 
| 30 November 1427KrakówSon of Jogaila and Sophia of Halshany
| Elizabeth of Habsburg, 13 children
| 7 June 1492GrodnoAged 64
| SuccessionPreviously Grand Duke of LithuaniaDivided the Polish-Lithuanian realm between John and Alexander
| Jagiellon

|-
| KingJohn I Albert23 September 149217 June 1501()
| 
| 
| 27 December 1459KrakówSon of Casimir IV and Elizabeth of Habsburg
| Unmarried and childless
| 17 June 1501ToruńAged 41
| Succeeded his father in PolandLaid foundation for the Sejm and Senate (Polish Parliament)
| Jagiellon

|-
| KingAlexander12 December 150119 August 1506()
| 
| 
| 5 August 1461KrakówSon of Casimir IV and Elizabeth of Habsburg
|  Helena of Moscow, childless
| 19 August 1506VilniusAged 45
| Succeeded his brother in PolandPreviously Grand Duke of LithuaniaBuried in Lithuania
| Jagiellon

|-
| KingSigismund I the Old8 December 15061 April 1548()
| 
| 
| 1 January 1467KozieniceSon of Casimir IV and Elizabeth of Habsburg
|  Barbara Zápolya Bona Sforza of Milan
| 1 April 1548KrakówAged 81
| Succeeded his brother in Poland and Lithuania
| Jagiellon

|-
| KingSigismund II Augustus1 April 15487 July 1572()
| 
| 
| 1 August 1520KrakówSon of Sigismund I and Bona Sforza
|  Elizabeth of Austria Barbara Radziwiłł Catherine of Austria
| 7 July 1572KnyszynAged 51
| SuccessionFormation of the Polish–Lithuanian Commonwealth with an elective monarchyLast male member of the Jagiellonian Dynasty, died heirless
| Jagiellon
|}

Polish–Lithuanian Commonwealth, 1569–1795

|-
| KingHenry16 May 157312 May 1575()
| 
| 
| 19 September 1551FontainebleauSon of Henry II and Catherine de' Medici
|  Louise of Lorraine, no children
| 2 August 1589Saint-CloudAged 37
| ElectedLeft Poland in June 1574 to succeed his brother in FranceInterregnum until 1575
| Valois

|-
| QueenAnna15 December 157519 August 1587 (de facto) 9 September 1596 (de jure) 
| 
| 
| 18 October 1523KrakówDaughter of Sigismund I and Bona Sforza
|  Stephen Báthory, no children
| 9 September 1596WarsawAged 72
| Elected co-monarch with Stephen BáthorySole ruler until Báthory's arrival and coronation in May 1576Ruled after husband's death until her nephew was elected 
| Jagiellon

|-
| KingStephen Báthory1 May 157612 December 1586()
| 
| 
| 27 September 1533Szilágysomlyó (Șimleu Silvaniei)Son of Stephen Báthory of Somlyó and Catherine Telegdi
|  Anna Jagiellon, no children
| 12 December 1586GrodnoAged 53
| Elected as co-monarch with Anna JagiellonPreviously Prince of Transylvania
| Báthory

|-
| KingSigismund III19 August 158730 April 1632()
| 
| 
| 20 June 1566GripsholmSon of John III of Sweden and Catherine Jagiellon
|  Anne of Austria Constance of Austria
| 30 April 1632WarsawAged 65
| Elected, nephew of Anna JagiellonTransferred capital from Kraków to WarsawHereditary King of Sweden until deposition in 1599
| Vasa

|-
| KingWładysław IValso Ladislaus IV8 November 163220 May 1648()
| 
| 
| 9 June 1595ŁobzówSon of Sigismund III and Anne of Austria
|  Cecilia Renata of Austria Marie Louise Gonzaga
| 20 May 1648MerkinėAged 52
| Elective successionAlso titular King of Sweden and elected Tsar of Russia (1610–1613) when the Polish army captured Moscow
| Vasa

|-
| KingJohn II Casimir20 November 164816 September 1668()
| 
| 
| 22 March 1609KrakówSon of Sigismund III and Constance of Austria
|  Marie Louise Gonzaga Claudine Françoise Mignot (morganatic marriage)
| 16 December 1672NeversAged 63
| Elective succession, succeeded half-brotherPreviously a cardinalTitular King of SwedenAbdicated
| Vasa

|-
| KingMichael I19 June 166910 November 1673()
| 
| 
| 31 May 1640Biały KamieńSon of Jeremi Wiśniowiecki and Gryzelda Konstancja Zamoyska
|  Eleonora Maria of Austria, no children
| 10 November 1673LwówAged 33
| ElectedBorn into nobility of mixed heritage, the son of a military commander and governor
| Wiśniowiecki

|-
| KingJohn III Sobieski19 May 167417 June 1696()
| 
| 
| 17 August 1629OleskoSon of Jakub Sobieski and Teofila Zofia
|  Marie Casimire d'Arquien, 13 children
| 17 June 1696WilanówAged 66
| ElectedBorn into nobilityA successful military commander
| Sobieski

|-
| KingAugustus II15 September 16971706(1st reign, 9 years)
| 
| 
| 12 May 1670DresdenSon of John George III and Princess Anna Sophie of Denmark
|  Christiane Eberhardine of Brandenburg-Bayreuth, 1 son by wife
| 1 February 1733WarsawAged 62
| ElectedPreviously Elector and ruler of SaxonyDethroned by Stanislaus I in 1706 during the Great Northern War
| Wettin

|-
| KingStanislaus I12 July 17048 July 1709(1st reign)
| 
| 
| 20 October 1677LwówSon of Rafał Leszczyński and Anna Jabłonowska
|  Catherine Opalińska, 2 children
| 23 February 1766LunévilleAged 88
| UsurpedNominated as ruler in 1704, crowned in 1705 and deposed predecessor in 1706Exiled in 1709
| Leszczyński

|-
| KingAugustus II8 July 17091 February 1733(2nd reign)
| 
| 
| 12 May 1670DresdenSon of John George III and Princess Anna Sophie of Denmark
|  Christiane Eberhardine of Brandenburg-Bayreuth, 1 son by wife
| 1 February 1733WarsawAged 62
| Restored
| Wettin

|-
| KingStanislaus I12 September 173326 January 1736(2nd reign)
| 
| 
| 20 October 1677LwówSon of Rafał Leszczyński and Anna Jabłonowska
|  Catherine Opalińska, 2 children
| 23 February 1766LunévilleAged 88
| ElectedHis election sparked the War of the Polish SuccessionDeposed by Augustus III in 1736
| Leszczyński

|-
| KingAugustus III5 October 17335 October 1763(30 years)
| 
| 
| 17 October 1696DresdenSon of Augustus II the Strong and Christiane Eberhardine
|  Maria Josepha of Austria, 16 children
| 5 October 1763DresdenAged 66
| UsurpedProclaimed King of Poland in 1733, crowned in 1734Dethroned elected predecessor in 1736
| Wettin

|-
| KingStanislaus II Augustus7 September 176425 November 1795()
| 
| 
| 17 January 1732WołczynSon of Stanisław Poniatowski and Konstancja Czartoryska
| Unmarried
| 1 February 1798Saint PetersburgAged 66
| ElectedBorn into nobilityLast King of Poland and Grand Duke of Lithuania, his reign ended in the Partitions of Poland
| Poniatowski
|}

Duchy of Warsaw, 1807–1815

|-
| Grand DukeFrederick Augustus I9 June 180722 May 1815()
| 
| 
| 23 December 1750DresdenSon of Frederick Christian, Elector of Saxony and Maria Antonia of Bavaria
|  Amalie of Zweibrücken-Birkenfeld,  1 daughter
| 5 May 1827DresdenAged 76
| Treaties of TilsitDesignated as a king of Poland by General Confederation of the Kingdom of Poland, 1812.
| Wettin
|}

Pretenders to the Polish throne

 Vratislaus II of Bohemia (1085–1092)
 Rudolf I of Bohemia (1306–1307)
 Henry of Bohemia (1307–1310)
 John of Bohemia (1310–1335)
 Archduke Charles Stephen of Austria (1916–1918)
 Kiril, Prince of Preslav (1916–1918)

Modern
 Alexander, Margrave of Meissen (2012–), disputed
 Rüdiger, Margrave of Meissen (2012–2022), disputed
 Daniel, Margrave of Meissen (2022–), disputed. Son of Rüdiger

Not recognized royal elections

 Maxmilian II Habsburg (1575–1576), See: 1576 Free election
 Maxmilian III Habsburg (1587–1589), See: 1587 Free election
 François Louis de Bourbon (1697), See: 1697 Free election

See also
 Coronations in Poland
 Dukes of Greater Poland
 Dukes of Masovia
 Dukes of Pomerania
 Dukes of Sieradz-Łęczyca
 Dukes of Silesia
 Kings of Poland family tree
 List of rulers of Partitioned Poland
 List of Galician rulers
 List of heads of state of Poland
 List of Poles
 List of Polish consorts
 List of prime ministers of Poland
 Princely Houses of Poland

References

Bibliography
 Duczmal M., Jagiellonowie. Leksykon biograficzny, Kraków 1996.
 Dybkowska A., Żaryn J., Żaryn M., Polskie dzieje. Od czasów najdawniejszych po współczesność, wyd. 2, Warszawa 1995. 
 Gierowski J.A., Rzeczpospolita w dobie złotej wolności (1648–1763), Kraków 2001. 
 Grodziski S., Polska w czasach przełomu (1764–1815), Kraków 2001. 
 Grodziski S., Porównawcza historia ustrojów państwowych, Kraków 1998. 
 Grzybowski S., Dzieje Polski i Litwy (1506–1648), Kraków 2000. 
 Morby J.E., Dynastie świata. Przewodnik chronologiczny i genealogiczny, Kraków 1995, s. 261–263. 
 Wyrozumski J., Dzieje Polski piastowskiej (VIII w.-1370), Kraków 1999. 
 Zientara B., Henryk Brodaty i jego czasy, wyd. 2, Warszawa 1997.

External links

 Górczyk, Wojciech, "Półksiężyc, orzeł, lew i smok. Uwagi o godłach napieczętnych Piastów" Histmag.org June 14, 2009

 
Monarchs
Poland
Monarchs

lt:Lenkijos karalius